Frederick Hugh Sherston Roberts VC (8 January 1872 – 17 December 1899) was a British Army officer and recipient of the Victoria Cross, the highest award for gallantry in the face of the enemy that can be awarded to British and Commonwealth forces. Roberts was the son of the famous Victorian commander Field Marshal Frederick Roberts, 1st Earl Roberts.

Early life
Born in Umballa, India, Roberts attended Eton College and joined the British Army soon after completing his studies. As the son of Field Marshal Frederick Roberts, 1st Earl Roberts, one of the greatest commanders of the Victorian era, he followed his father into the army and, after the Royal Military College, Sandhurst, he was commissioned as a second lieutenant in the King's Royal Rifle Corps on 10 June 1891. After joining the army he was soon involved in action, fighting in the Waziristan Expedition in 1894 and 1895, where he was mentioned in dispatches. He came to the attention of senior officers for his effective leadership. In 1898 he took part in the Nile Expedition following which he was promoted lieutenant, and awarded Order of Meijidieh, Fourth Class from the Ottoman Empire.

Second Boer War
At the age of 27, Roberts went with the King's Rifles to the Second Boer War, when the following deed took place for which he was awarded the Victoria Cross.

On 15 December 1899 at the Battle of Colenso, South Africa, Roberts, with several others, tried to save the guns of the 14th and 66th Batteries, Royal Field Artillery, when the detachments serving the guns had all become casualties or been driven from their guns. Some of the horses and drivers were sheltering in a donga, a dried watercourse, about 500 yards behind the guns and the intervening space was swept with shell and rifle fire. Roberts with two other officers (Walter Congreve and Harry Norton Schofield) and Corporal George Edward Nurse helped to hook a team into a limber and then to limber up a gun. While doing so, he fell badly wounded and two days later died of his wounds at Chieveley, Natal.  The action was observed by the Commander-in-Chief, Redvers Buller, who recommended Roberts for the VC in a despatch written on 16 December, before Roberts had died from his wounds.

Confirmation of the award was made on 2 February 1900, the citation reading:

Roberts and his father were one of only three father-son pairs to win the VC, his father having won it in 1858 for an action at Khudaganj during the Indian rebellion.

F.H.S. Robert's Victoria Cross is displayed at the National Army Museum in Chelsea, England.

References

External links

1872 births
1899 deaths
Military personnel of British India
British Army recipients of the Victoria Cross
British military personnel of the Chitral Expedition
British military personnel killed in the Second Boer War
British Army personnel of the Second Boer War
Graduates of the Royal Military College, Sandhurst
Heirs apparent who never acceded
King's Royal Rifle Corps officers
People from Ambala
People educated at Eton College
Recipients of the Order of the Medjidie, 4th class
Second Boer War recipients of the Victoria Cross
Burials in South Africa